The 2023 National Development League is the third division/tier of British speedway for the 2023 season. It is a semi-professional development league, containing mainly the junior sides of SGB Premiership and SGB Championship clubs. Leicester Lion Cubs will defend the title.

Summary
Eight clubs will compete for the League Championship after the addition of the Workington Comets to the league, who will race on the new Northside track. Armadale Devils were renamed Edinburgh Monarchs Academy, while the Plymouth Centurions did not return.

The league points system changed in-line with the SGB Premiership and SGB Championship, with teams scoring two points for a win (home or away), with a bonus point scored for an aggregate win. A 'Super Heat' has also been introduced in the event of a tied meeting, with the winners scoring two league points and the losers gaining one point. The top two in the league will qualify for the Grand Final.

The rider points limit for team construction is 42 points.

Regular season

League table

Final
First leg

Second leg

Knockout Cup
The 2023 National Development League Knockout Cup will be the 24th edition of the Knockout Cup for tier three teams.

Squads

Belle Vue Colts

 (C)

Berwick Bullets
 (C)

Edinburgh Monarchs Academy

Kent Royals

 

 

 (C)

Leicester Lion Cubs
 
 
 

 

 (C)

Mildenhall Fen Tigers

 (C)

Oxford Chargers

Workington Comets

 (C)

See also
List of United Kingdom speedway league champions
Knockout Cup (speedway)

References

National League
National Development League
Speedway National League